Shannon's Rainbow (also listed as Amazing Racer) is a 2009 drama and family film both produced and directed by Frank E. Johnson. It stars Julianne Michelle and Claire Forlani, with a musical score by Charles David Denler.

The film was shot in western Pennsylvania from a script written by John Mowod 
and Larry Richert and based on Mowod's own experiences seeing his brother rehabilitate an injured horse and win a championship horse race.

The main character's story about recently experiencing the death of her father is loosely based on the death of Jeff Gardner, good friend of Mowod and Richert.  Mowod and Gardner collaborated on the outline of the film before Jeff Gardner was killed in an accident.  The film takes its name from Jeff's oldest daughter, Shannon, and is dedicated to Jeff.

Plot
A 17-year-old girl named Shannon (Julianne Michelle) faces and overcomes hardship with the discovery of the mother she never knew and with her love for a hobbled horse named Rainbow.  With her father dying in the earliest moments of the film Shannon has to learn from a friend of the family that her father participated in kidnapping her from her mother (Christine) moments after birth.  Once the hospital therapist is through with her she ends up moving from Florida to Pennsylvania where Christine lives and works as a neo-natal pediatrician.  She gets involved in the lives of Christine's boyfriend Eric and his nephew Brandon and niece Rio.  They have a stables that works in harness racing and have been bringing along a filly named Rainbow who takes very strongly to Shannon.  Eric and those around him are targets of a spiteful grudge held by the rich Mitchell Prescott who buys the filly for $15,000 in a claiming race she was entered in for experience.  Mitchell runs Rainbow into the ground, having her beaten until nearly dead for the sin of having a mind of her own and an unshakable preference for Shannon, then sells her off to the knackers.  Eric is alerted to this and tracks down the horse van en route to the location where Rainbow is due to be slaughtered and buys her back for $400.  The filly is returned to Shannon's care and a trainer with a murky past (Max) is given the task to return her to health and soundness.  They move Rainbow to a neighboring farm to train her to racing fitness while avoiding a spy at Parker stables.  The culmination is at the Pennsylvania Cup harness race.

Cast
Julianne Michelle as Shannon Greene
Claire Forlani as Christine Pearson 
Daryl Hannah as Dr. Rita Baker
Michael Madsen as Dave Blair
Eric Roberts as Mitchell Prescott
Charles Durning as Floyd
Steve Guttenberg as Ed
Stephen Colletti as Brandon
Jason Gedrick as Eric Parker
Louis Gossett Jr. as Max
Tom Atkins as Captain Martin
Krista Allen as Jessica
Lauren Potter as Kerry
Carson Brown as Rio
Scott Eastwood as Joey
Joanna Pacula as Emily Blair

Additional sources
Thoroughbred Times: "Harness racing movie to be filmed at the Meadows"
Pittsburgh Post-Gazette: "British actress enjoyed time with good ol' boys"
Harnasslink: "Shannon's Rainbow begins shooting"
KDKA Television: "Larry On The Job: Movie Director"

References

External links

Shannon's Rainbow at New York Times
Shannon's Rainbow at Fluge

Films about horses
2009 drama films
2009 films
2000s English-language films
American drama films
English-language drama films